The Gandstock (2,315 m) is a mountain of the Glarus Alps, located south-east of Schwanden in the canton of Glarus. It lies at the northern end of the range separating the main Linth valley from the Sernftal, north of the Kärpf.

On its west side is located the Garichtisee.

References

External links
Gandstock on Hikr

Mountains of the Alps
Mountains of Switzerland
Mountains of the canton of Glarus
Two-thousanders of Switzerland